Cyanastrum is a genus of plants in the family Tecophilaeaceae, native to tropical Africa. It contains three currently recognized species.

Description
Cyanastrum has a corm that lacks a protective tunic. The leaf and the inflorescence emerge from different corm-scales, and are present at different times. The leaf has a short stalk, is basal and is usually single. The inflorescence is a raceme, often with no bracts, the tepals are blue and the flowers have parts in sixes.

Species
The following species are recognized:
 Cyanastrum cordifolium Oliv. -- Nigeria, Cameroon, Equatorial Guinea, Gabon, Congo-Brazzaville, Zaire (Congo-Kinshasa)
 Cyanastrum goetzeanum Engl. -- Tanzania
 Cyanastrum johnstonii Baker in D.Oliver & auct. suc. (eds.) -- Tanzania, Zambia, Mozambique, Zaire (Congo-Kinshasa)

References

Asparagales genera